HD 172555 is a white-hot A7V star located relatively close by, 95 light years from Earth in the direction of the constellation Pavo. Spectrographic evidence indicates a relatively recent collision between two planet-sized bodies that destroyed the smaller of the two, which had been at least the size of Moon, and severely damaged the larger one, which was at least the size of Mercury. Evidence of the collision was detected by NASA's Spitzer Space Telescope.

Giant hypervelocity impact debris 
HD172555 was first recognized in the 1980s as being unusually bright in the mid-infrared by the IRAS sky survey. Follow-up, ground-based observations by Schütz et al.  and the Spitzer Space Telescope, also in 2004, confirmed the unusually strong nature of the infrared spectral emission from this system, much brighter than what would be emitted normally from the star's surface. As part of the Beta Pictoris moving group, HD172555 is coeval with that more famous system, approximately 20 million years old, and is the same kind of white-hot star as Beta Pic, about twice as massive as the Sun and about 9.5 times as luminous. Comparison with current planetary formation theories, and with the very similar Beta Pic system, suggests that HD172555 is in the early stages of terrestrial (rocky) planet formation.

What makes HD 172555 special is the presence of a large amount of unusual silicaceous material – amorphous silica and SiO gas – not the usual rocky materials, silicates like olivine and pyroxene, which make up much of the Earth as well. The material in the disk was analyzed in 2009 by Carey Lisse, of the Johns Hopkins University Applied Physics Laboratory in Laurel, MD using the infrared spectrometer on board the Spitzer Space Telescope, and the results of the Deep Impact and STARDUST comet missions. Analysis of the atomic and mineral composition, dust temperature, and dust mass show a massive (about a Moon's mass worth) amount of warm (about 340K) material similar to re-frozen lava (obsidian) and flash-frozen magma (tektite) as well as copious amounts of vaporized rock (silicon monoxide or SiO gas) and rubble (large dark pieces of dust) in a region at 5.8+/-0.6 AU from the HD172555 (inside the frost line of that system). The material had to have been created in a hypervelocity impact between two large bodies; relative velocities at impacts less than 10 km/s would not transform the ubiquitous olivine and pyroxene into silica and SiO gas. Giant impacts at this speed typically destroy the incident body, and melt the entire surface of the impactee.

The implications for the detection of abundant amorphous silica and SiO gas are the following:

 Massive hypervelocity impacts happen in young planetary systems. There are a number of examples of such impacts in the Solar System (Hartmann & Vail 1986): Mercury's high density; Venus' retrograde rotation; Earth's Moon; Mars' North/South hemispherical cratering anisotropy; Vesta's igneous origin (Drake 2001); Uranus' rotation axis located near the plane of the ecliptic. Local geological evidence for widespread impact melting includes tektites found on Earth and glass beads found in lunar soils (Warren 2008).

 Rocky protoplanets, and possibly planets, exist in the HD172555 system, at about 20 Myr after its formation.

 If the collision happened within the last few thousand years, there is likely a protoplanet in the HD172555 system with a liquid magma surface. This is not unexpected; a simple calculation of the gravitational binding energy of the Earth, shows that the energy released in assembling the Earth is about 10x the amount needed to melt it.

Follow-up VISNIR observations of the system published in 2020 have shown that the majority of observed fine dust is composed of very fine grains 1-4 micrometers diameter. as expected from a recent hypervelocity impact.

In 2021, a carbon monoxide ring at ~6 AU separation from the star was also found in the system by ALMA, further reinforcing a giant impact scenario for explaining the system's structure. The large amount of CO gas detected would likely have been sourced from the colliding planets' atmospheres. 

In 2023, a detection of a transit of a cometary body approximately 2.5km diameter core at 0.05 AU from star was announced.

See also 
2M1207b

References

External links 
When worlds collide. Phil Plait, Discover website, Blogs / Bad Astronomy. August 10, 2009. NASA animation of what the collision may have looked like. Retrieved 2009-08-11

Further reading 

Pavo (constellation)
Hypothetical planetary systems
Durchmusterung objects
172555
092024
Circumstellar disks
A-type subgiants
Beta Pictoris moving group